The pterygospinous ligament stretches from the upper part of the posterior border of the lateral pterygoid plate to the spinous process of the sphenoid.

Structure

Variation
It occasionally ossifies, and in such cases, between its upper border and the base of the skull, a foramen is formed - pterygospinous foramen (Civinini) which transmits the branches of the mandibular nerve to the muscles of mastication.

See also 
Pterygoalar ligament

References 

Joints